Elections to Omagh District Council were held on 15 May 1985 on the same day as the other Northern Irish local government elections. The election used three district electoral areas to elect a total of 21 councillors.

Election results

Note: "Votes" are the first preference votes.

Districts summary

|- class="unsortable" align="centre"
!rowspan=2 align="left"|Ward
! % 
!Cllrs
! % 
!Cllrs
! %
!Cllrs
! %
!Cllrs
! % 
!Cllrs
! % 
!Cllrs
!rowspan=2|TotalCllrs
|- class="unsortable" align="center"
!colspan=2 bgcolor="" | Sinn Féin
!colspan=2 bgcolor="" | SDLP
!colspan=2 bgcolor="" | DUP
!colspan=2 bgcolor="" | UUP
!colspan=2 bgcolor="" | IIP
!colspan=2 bgcolor="white"| Others
|-
|align="left"|Mid Tyrone
|bgcolor="#008800"|45.1
|bgcolor="#008800"|3
|12.2
|1
|17.6
|1
|13.4
|1
|4.7
|1
|7.0
|0
|7
|-
|align="left"|Omagh Town
|18.7
|1
|20.9
|2
|bgcolor="#D46A4C"|22.7
|bgcolor="#D46A4C"|2
|13.4
|1
|1.2
|0
|23.1
|1
|7
|-
|align="left"|West Tyrone
|bgcolor="#008800"|28.7
|bgcolor="#008800"|2
|20.2
|2
|17.1
|1
|22.9
|2
|6.3
|0
|4.8
|0
|7
|-
|- class="unsortable" class="sortbottom" style="background:#C9C9C9"
|align="left"| Total
|31.6
|6
|17.6
|5
|18.9
|4
|16.8
|4
|4.2
|1
|10.9
|1
|21
|-
|}

District results

Mid Tyrone

1985: 3 x Sinn Féin, 1 x DUP, 1 x UUP, 1 x SDLP, 1 x IIP

Omagh Town

1985: 2 x SDLP, 2 x DUP, 1 x Sinn Féin, 1 x UUP, 1 x Independent Labour

West Tyrone

1985: 2 x UUP, 2 x SDLP, 2 x Sinn Féin, 1 x DUP

References

Omagh District Council elections
Omagh